Lamine Tamba (born 20 December 1985) is a Senegalese footballer who plays as a defender. He spent most of his club career in India with teams competing in the I-League.

Tamba played for Churchill Brothers in the 2013 AFC Cup.

References

Senegalese footballers
Senegalese expatriate sportspeople in India
1985 births
Living people
Expatriate footballers in India
Pune FC players
I-League players
Mahindra United FC players
Air India FC players
Churchill Brothers FC Goa players
Rangdajied United F.C. players
Real Kashmir FC players
Association football defenders
Wasquehal Football players